Agnes of Saxe-Lauenburg (died 1435), was a Duchess consort of Pomerania by marriage to Wartislaw VIII, Duke of Pomerania. 

She was the regent of Pomerania in 1415–1425 during the minority of her of her children, Barnim VIII and Swantibor II, and her nephews, sons of Barnim VI: Warcislaus IX and Barnim VII.

Issue
 Wartislaw (born:  – died: 1414 or 1415)
 Barnim VIII (born:  – died: 1451) married Anna of Wunstorf
 Swantibor IV of Pomerania (born:  – died: between 1432 and 1436)
 Sophia (died: after 1453), married William, Lord of Werle (d. 1436)

References

1435 deaths
15th-century women rulers
Daughters of monarchs

Year of birth unknown
15th-century German women